Tribal Worldwide (Formerly Tribal DDB) is a global network of interactive agencies, established in 2000, when the advertising company DDB integrated all its interactive-web properties under the Tribal brand. Tribal Worldwide is part of Omnicom Group's DDB Worldwide.

Specialization
Tribal Worldwide specializes in interactive marketing, namely: websites, digital campaigns, digital communication, microsites, online video, web banners and more.  Tribal Worldwide has areas of specialty that they call "centers of excellence" in the following areas: planning, gaming, mobile, iTV, search engine marketing, search engine optimization, management consulting, eCommerce, SONAR, and Health & Wellness.  Tribal Worldwide also does pro bono work and is affiliated with the Ad Council. Tribal clients have included Pepsi, Lipton, Volkswagen, Neutrogena, Philips, Nokia, McDonald's, Netflix, Hewlett-Packard and Nike among others.

Awards

2009
Cannes - Film Grand Prix (for Carousel)

2008
AdAge Global Agency of the Year

See also
Tribal Worldwide London - UK office

References

External links
Tribal Worldwide official web site
Omnicom Group official web site

Advertising agencies of the United States